Princess Projectra is a fictional character, a superheroine in the DC Comics universe. Typically portrayed as a haughty member of an alien royal family, she lives in the 30th and 31st centuries, and is a member of the Legion of Super-Heroes. 

Projectra was one of Jim Shooter's early creations on Legion of Super Heroes that helped cement his place in history as one of the seminal creators for the IP. Shooter sold the original script in which Projectra debuted to DC Comics editor Mort Weisinger when Shooter was only 14 years old.

Publication history
In 1965, when he was just 13 years old, Jim Shooter submitted an unsolicited script to DC Comics editor Mort Weisinger. Weisinger was so impressed, he asked Shooter to send in another script. Shooter created a short origin story for Princess Projectra and several other characters and sent it in. Weisinger purchased all of these, and immediately started giving him writing assignments.

Shooter's Projectra story first appeared in Adventure Comics #346 (July 1966) ("One of Us Is a Traitor"), when Shooter was 14 years old. The character later resigned from the Legion of Superheroes, and left the title, though later Legionnaire writer Paul Levitz had always intended to bring her back to the series in some form.

In 1985, in the Who Is Sensor Girl? storyline, a new character "Sensor Girl" was introduced. This character was fully masked, and when eventually unmasked, turned out to have been Projectra the whole time.

Sensor Girl's true identity was unknown to the other characters in the story and even to some of the creators on the title. Penciller Steve Lightle, who created Sensor Girl's costume, had no idea the character was supposed to be Princess Projectra, and believed her to be Supergirl. It is believed Levitz came up with the idea that Sensor Girl was Projectra significantly far into the development process of the story.

After this story line, she returned to her "Projectra" identity, but the character's most enduring association is arguably with this brief interlude as a mystery character.

Starting in the July 2019 series Legion of Super Heroes: Millennium, the character received a significant visual re-design.

Fictional character biography

Projectra (often called by her nickname "Jeckie", a shortened form of her name) is a member of the royal family of the low-tech planet Orando, and possesses the superhuman ability to generate illusions affecting all five senses. During her membership in the LSH, she met, fell in love with, and married the martial artist Karate Kid. After her father King Voxv died, she fought both her cousin Pharoxx and her grandmother and mentor, Hagga, who sought to usurp the throne. Afterward she became Queen Projectra of Orando, and she and Karate Kid became reserve members of the Legion of Super-Heroes. When the Legion of Super-Villains invaded Orando, Nemesis Kid defeated Karate Kid in personal combat. A dying Karate Kid used the last of his strength to destroy the Legion of Super-Villains machinery trying to move Orando to another dimension. Projectra subsequently killed Nemesis Kid in revenge, claiming royal privilege to do so even though it violated the Legion's code against killing. She resigned from the Legion of Super-Heroes during Karate Kid's funeral and used the Legion of Super-Villains' warp devices to take Orando to another dimension to preserve them from 30th century technology and dangers.

Projectra was later ordered by her elders to pay penance for indirectly bringing the Legion of Super-Villains to Orando and returned to the Legion's dimension, using the pseudonym Sensor Girl. Her powers were enhanced giving her the ability to see beyond the illusions of life (such as the "illusions" of distance and physical obstacles). Rather than create obvious illusions, she used her illusion-projection effects to partially or completely block her opponents' senses, project an illusion of darkness (similar to that of Shadow Lass), or disorient victims by making it appear that their skin had vanished. Projectra kept the basis of her sensory alterations secret, since enemies familiar with her illusions might be able to ignore them. Initially she kept her identity hidden even from her fellow Legionnaires except for Saturn Girl, who vouched for her. She also cloaked herself with an illusionary disguise which fully masked her face. Some Legionnaires (particularly Brainiac 5) believed that she was a clone of Supergirl, who had been murdered by the Anti-Monitor during the Crisis. Projectra was later unmasked by the Emerald Empress during a battle with the Fatal Five. Afterwards, however, most individuals outside of the Legion continued to remain unaware of her true identity. Sensor Girl was at one point the Legion leader.

Within the five-year timespan following the Magic Wars, Earth fell under the covert control of the Dominators, and withdrew from the United Planets. During this period, Projectra lost her heightened Sensor Girl abilities (although her original illusion-casting powers remained). Some time later, the members of the Dominators' highly classified "Batch SW6" escaped captivity. Originally, Batch SW6 appeared to be a group of teenage Legionnaire clones, created from samples apparently taken just prior to Ferro Lad's death at the hands of the Sun-Eater. Later, they were revealed to be time-paradox duplicates, every bit as legitimate as their older counterparts, but the SW6 version of Projectra was killed in battle (along with SW6's Chameleon Boy and Karate Kid) fighting Dominion troops.

Post-Zero Hour reboot

The 1994 event known as Zero Hour removed Projectra/Sensor Girl from continuity. A new, non-humanoid Sensor character with similar powers was introduced in her place in the reboot continuity.

Threeboot

In 2004 continuity, Projectra is once again human. She is initially depicted as a spoiled child of the Orando royals and a non-powered but financially well-endowed supporter of the new Legion. Her demeanor changes when her homeworld is destroyed, leaving her without a family or any financial and social privileges. Projectra's attitude has become increasingly cold, detached, and almost selfish in nature.  The tragic demise of her parents has also awakened her hereditary powers, the ability to generate illusions, based on a particular form of witchcraft.

She has since expressed some degree of interest in human history, especially the actions of the 21st century heroes as detailed in comic books, often asking her friends to translate ancient comics from English to Interlac. She is in a relationship with Timber Wolf.

She has come to blame the Legion and the United Planets for the destruction of Orando, becoming increasingly colder and reclusive with the time passing. Upon meeting some Orando survivors, she plans her vengeance on the Legion, at first in a sneaky, covert way, then taking some vicious, proactive steps. These steps included having Nura Nal, at the time trapped in Brainiac 5's mind, blinded and stripped of her powers by the physical representations of Brainiac 5's inhibitions and urges (she would have been killed, if not for his superior mental discipline); viciously beating up Phantom Girl; and hypnotically mindwiping Saturn Girl to prevent her from speaking the truth about her findings upon her. Despite Timber Wolf discovering her treachery at the same time as Imra, and without being discovered, he deliberately hid the proof against her, activating Phantom Girl's Legion Ring Alarm only when he was sure Projectra was away, saving Tinya's life but granting his lover impunity.

Nearing the end of the current run of the Legion, Princess Projectra's power increased exponentially, granting her absolute mastery on the id of individuals. In addition to creating illusions, her witchcraft can now briefly alter the behavior of individuals, forcing them to act out of their basest emotions, like rage and lust, and even grant a tangible form to inhibitions and the darkest corner of someone's psyche. Her increased powers are now fueled by the desire of revenge and the lingering id of everyone who  died on Orando.

Since her powers, fueled by magic, are able to prey on the subconscious and the most atavic part of the human brain, she's more powerful than a skilled telepath like Saturn Girl, since a telepath must always start from the higher, conscious brain functions: because of this difference, the Threeboot incarnation of Projectra, despite being unable to hide her anger from Saturn Girl, was able to mindwipe her, placing in Imra's mind convincing false memories so precise as to fool her.

Post-Infinite Crisis
In the pages of Justice Society of America #6, the pre-Crisis Sensor Girl seemingly returns, and now the seventh pre-Crisis Legionnaire to arrive along with Dream Girl, Star Boy, Dawnstar, Wildfire, Timber Wolf, and Karate Kid. Writer Geoff Johns has indicated that this group is, for all intents and purposes, the original Legion, who have merely been "missing" from continuity since Crisis on Infinite Earths, possibly due to machinations by the Time Trapper. One difference in Sensor Girl's history is Superman's full knowledge of her true identity as Projectra before Crisis on Infinite Earths; in original continuity, this revelation was made in the post-Crisis timeline.

Sensor Girl, after being sent into the past along with the six other Legionnaires, suffered a type of mental breakdown and hid in Slaughter Swamp until her presence was almost discovered by Damage, Liberty Belle, Wonder Woman, Hourman, and Black Lightning. She then created the illusion of an abandoned hideout of the Secret Society of Super Villains (visually resembling a run-down version of the Hall of Doom), along with illusions of Triplicate Girl and Computo to try to keep them distracted.

The Computo illusion attacked the heroes until the Legionnaires and the rest of the Justice League and Justice Society arrived. Dawnstar reawoke Sensor Girl using the "wake-up word" that was used on the others (Lightning Lad in Interlac). However, Superman remembered the original battle between Computo and the Legionnaires, when Computo killed one of Triplicate Girl's copies, thus turning her into Duo Damsel. He and Power Girl saw through the façade using their x-ray vision. However, all seven of the Legionnaires had already left by the time they noticed, with Sensor Girl still playing out the mock battle. Rejoining her team, Sensor Girl participated in a mysterious ritual using lightning rods created by Brainiac 5.

Sensor Girl returned to the future after the Legionnaires completed their mission in the 21st century. Some time later, when the Legion was discredited by the Earth-Man and his "Justice League of Earth", she was counted among the missing Legionnaires who had disappeared during the Legion's dispersal across the galaxy. It is revealed in Superman #692, that Sensor Girl is living in 21st century Metropolis, going by the name of Officer Wilcox and working for the Science Police.

As revealed in Adventure Comics (vol. 2) #8, Sensor Girl is part of a secret team sent by the late RJ Brande to the 21st century to save the future in the Last Stand of New Krypton storyline.

See also
 Who Is Sensor Girl?

References

External links
A Hero History Of Princess Projectra/Sensor Girl
The Silver Age Pre-Crisis Princess Projectra

DC Comics aliens
Fictional illusionists
Fictional princesses
DC Comics extraterrestrial superheroes
DC Comics female superheroes
Characters created by Jim Shooter
Comics characters introduced in 1966
Comics characters introduced in 1985